Triphassa is a genus of moths of the family Pyralidae described by Jacob Hübner in 1818.

Species
Triphassa anaemialis Hampson, 1906 (from Nigeria)
Triphassa argentea Mey, 2011 (from South Africa)
Triphassa bilineata Moore, 1887 from Sri Lanka
Triphassa confusa Ghesquière, 1942 (from Congo)
Triphassa costipuncta de Joannis, 1930
Triphassa exustalis (Guenée, 1854) (from Congo and South Africa)
Triphassa flammealis Hampson, 1906 (from Ghana)
Triphassa flavifrons (Warren, 1892) (from Ghana)
Triphassa imbutalis Walker, [1866]
Triphassa luteicilialis Hampson, 1896
Triphassa marcrarthralis Hampson, 1908 (from India)
Triphassa marshalli (Hampson, 1906) (from South Africa)
Triphassa maynei Ghesquière, 1942 (from Congo)
Triphassa metaxantha Hampson, 1896
Triphassa ochrealis Hampson, 1893 (from South Africa)
Triphassa philerastis Meyrick, 1934 (from Congo)
Triphassa rufinalis (Felder & Rogenhofer, 1875) (from South Africa)
Triphassa senior Meyrick, 1936 (from Congo)
Triphassa smaragdina Ghesquière, 1942 (from Congo)
Triphassa stalachtis Hübner, 1818 (from South Africa and Lesotho)
Triphassa unilinealis (Warren, 1896)
Triphassa victorialis Karsch, 1900 (from Cameroon and Congo)
Triphassa vulsalis Walker, 1859
Triphassa xylinalis Swinhoe, 1886
Triphassa zeuxoalis Walker, 1863
Triphassa zonalis Hampson, 1899

References

Hübner, 1818. Zuträge zur Sammlung exotischer Schmetterlinge 1: 26.
"Triphassa Hübner, 1818 ". Butterflies and Moths of the World. Natural History Museum, London. Retrieved December 9, 2017.

 EOL - Encyclopedia of Life

Pyralinae
Pyralidae genera